The Pawtucket Elks Lodge Building is an historic site at 27 Exchange Street in the historic central business district of Pawtucket, Rhode Island.  The Mission/Spanish Revival building was designed by the O'Malley-Fitzsimmons Company and constructed in 1926.  It is three stories in height, with its facade faced in buff brick, laid in Flemish bond, and trimmed in cast stone.  Unusual for Elks lodges of the time, the building's first floor was devoted to commercial tenants, with the upper floors devoted to Elks facilities.

The building was listed on the National Register of Historic Places in 1983.

See also
National Register of Historic Places listings in Pawtucket, Rhode Island

References

Clubhouses on the National Register of Historic Places in Rhode Island
Buildings and structures in Pawtucket, Rhode Island
Elks buildings
National Register of Historic Places in Pawtucket, Rhode Island
Historic district contributing properties in Rhode Island